Mazama Glacier may refer to:

 Mazama Glacier (Mount Adams), U.S. state of Washington
 Mazama Glacier (Mount Baker), U.S. state of Washington